Donji Kukuruzari is a village and a municipality in Croatia in the Sisak-Moslavina County. Donji Kukuruzari is underdeveloped municipality which is statistically classified as the First Category Area of Special State Concern by the Government of Croatia.

It has a population of 1,634 (census 2011), in the following settlements:

 Babina Rijeka, population 127
 Borojevići, population 119
 Donja Velešnja, population 261
 Donji Bjelovac, population 43
 Donji Kukuruzari, population 297
 Gornja Velešnja, population 73
 Gornji Bjelovac, population 53
 Gornji Kukuruzari, population 51
 Knezovljani, population 81
 Komogovina, population 126
 Kostreši Bjelovački, population 43
 Lovča, population 19
 Mečenčani, population 148
 Prevršac, population 120
 Umetić, population 73

Demographics
1991 Serbs were majority 249 (82.72%), then Croats 43 (14.28%), Yugoslavs 2 (0.66%) and others 7 (2.32%).
2011 census, 64.44% (1053) were Croats and 34.82% (569) were Serbs.

Religion

Serbian Orthodox Church of the Dormition of the Theotokos
Serbian Orthodox Church of the Dormition of the Theotokos in Donji Kukuruzari was completed in 1838 while its iconostasis was painted in 1871 by painter Mihail Kutlija from Jasenovac. The church was devastated by the Ustashe regime during the World War II Genocide of Serbs in the Independent State of Croatia. The church's ring-bell was reconstructed just before the beginning of the Croatian War of Independence and it contained some of the icons originating from the nearby prominent Komogovina School of Orthodox art.

References

Populated places in Sisak-Moslavina County
Serb communities in Croatia
Municipalities of Croatia